Bejo Sugiantoro (born 2 April 1977) is an Indonesian footballer, he normally plays as defender, either as a libero or central defender. Together with  Kurniawan Dwi Yulianto, Anang Ma'ruf, Bima Sakti and the others he joined at PSSI Primavera Program at Italy in middle 1990s.

Sugiantoro made 45 appearances for the Indonesia national football team from 1997 to 2004.

Club career

Persebaya
Pak Haji Sugiantoro joined Persebaya Surabaya at the age of seventeen.

PS Mitra Kutai Kartanegara
In late December 2008, Bejo agreed a deal to sign for Mitra Kukar.

International career

International goals

Honours

Club honors
Persebaya Surabaya
Liga Indonesia Premier Division (2): 1996–97, 2004
Liga Indonesia First Division (1): 2006

Country honors
Indonesia
Southeast Asian Games silver medal (1): 1997
Southeast Asian Games bronze medal (1): 1999
Indonesian Independence Cup (1): 2000

References

External links

Indonesian footballers
1977 births
Living people
Indonesia international footballers
Liga 1 (Indonesia) players
Indonesian Super League-winning players
Southeast Asian Games bronze medalists for Indonesia
Southeast Asian Games medalists in football
Association football defenders
Competitors at the 1997 Southeast Asian Games
Competitors at the 1999 Southeast Asian Games
Persebaya Surabaya players
PSPS Pekanbaru players
Mitra Kukar players
Persidafon Dafonsoro players
Deltras F.C. players
2000 AFC Asian Cup players
People from Sidoarjo Regency
Sportspeople from East Java